Devika is a given name and surname. Notable people with that name include the following:

Given name
Devika, (1943 – 2002), Indian actress
Devika Bandana, Nepalese singer
Devika Bhagat (born 1979), Indian screenwriter
Devika Bhise, American actress
Devika Chawla, Indian singer
Devika Palshikar (born 1979), Indian cricketer
Devika Parikh (born 1966), American actress
Devika Rani (1908 – 1994), Indian actress
Devika Vaid (born 1992), Indian model and beauty queen
Devika Vaidya (born 1997), Indian cricketer

Fictional characters
Devika (Mahabharat), daughter of Govasana, wife of Yudhishthira and mother of Yaudheya in Mahabharata

Middle name
Cindy Devika Sharma, Trinidad and Tobago politicians

Surname
J. Devika, Malayali historian
Methil Devika (born 1976), Indian dance

See also

Davika Hoorne

Lists of people by surname